Dred may refer to:

People
 Mike Dred (born 1967), pseudonym of British musical artist Michael C. Cullen
 Dred Foxx, hip hop artist and voice of video game character PaRappa
 Dred Scott (ca. 1795 – September 17, 1858), American slave who sued unsuccessfully for his freedom in 1856
 Dred Scott (rapper), American rapper, songwriter and music producer

Other
 Department of Resources and Economic Development (DRED), a former government agency in the U.S. state of New Hampshire, superseded by the state's Department of Business and Economic Affairs (DBEA) and Department of Natural and Cultural Resources (DNCR)
Dred: A Tale of the Great Dismal Swamp, the second novel from American author Harriet Beecher Stowe
 Dred Scott v. Sandford, an 1857 landmark decision of the United States Supreme Court

See also
 Dread (disambiguation)
 Dredd (disambiguation)